Mohammad Bashir Qant Chah Abi served as the Governor of Sar-e Pol from August 2008 until 25 May 2010.

Bashir is a Hizb-e Islami commander from the Chah Ab district of northern Takhar Province.

References

See also
 List of current governors of Afghanistan

Governors of Sar-e Pol Province
Year of birth missing (living people)
Living people
People from Sar-e Pol Province
Jamiat-e Islami politicians